The Institute of Health for Welfare (Spanish: Instituto de Salud para el Bienestar, INSABI) is a government agency of Mexico that provides medical services to those people who are not covered by the Mexican Social Security Institute (IMSS) or the Institute for Social Security and Services for State Workers (ISSSTE). It was established in 2020 and replaced Seguro Popular, the previous health insurance scheme which had been created in 2003.

The director of INSABI is Juan Antonio Ferrer Aguilar.

References

External links

2020 establishments in Mexico
Government agencies of Mexico
Medical and health organizations based in Mexico
Organizations established in 2020